Mario Daniel Pierani Verstraete (born 25 July 1978) was an Argentine footballer. He had successful spells at San Luis de Quillota and Coquimbo Unido.

Born in Rosario, Argentina, Pierani began his football career with local semi-professional sides Juventud Unida and Club Argentino. He continued to play for semi-professional clubs in Santa Fe Province, Argentina until 2009, when he moved to Chile. After seven years in Chile, including one season in the Primera A with San Luis, Pierani returned to Argentina. He scored the goal that qualified Sportivo Rivadiva for the final stage of the 2015–16 Copa Argentina.

Honours

Player
San Luis Quillota
 Primera B de Chile (1): 2009 Apertura

Coquimbo Unido
 Primera B de Chile (1): 2014 Clausura

References

 

1978 births
Living people
Pierani, Mario
Pierani, Mario
Pierani, Mario
Coquimbo Unido footballers
Pierani, Mario
Association football defenders
Footballers from Rosario, Santa Fe